Sura Wiqu (Aymara sura dry jiquima, a species of Pachyrhizus, wiqu a corner in a house, a mountain cove, "jiquima cove", Hispanicized spelling Soravico) is a mountain in the Andes of southern Peru, about  high. It lies in the Puno Region, El Collao Province, Capazo District. Sura Wiqu is situated north-west of the mountain Wanq'uri and north-east of the mountain Tuma Tumani.

References

Mountains of Peru
Mountains of Puno Region